The MAT/5 is an Italian circular, plastic-cased minimum metal blast resistant anti-tank blast mine. It uses a pneumatic fuze which is resistant to shock and blast, and is also claimed to be resistant to mine flails and mine rollers. The mine's plastic case is waterproof, and it can be laid in shallow water. Additionally the mine will function upside down. The mine can be fitted with anti-handling devices. The mine is no longer in production.

Specifications
 Diameter: 290 mm
 Height: 108 mm
 Weight: 7 kg
 Explosive content: 5 kg of Composition B
 Operating pressure: 180 to 310 kg

References
 Jane's Mines and Mine Clearance 2005-2006
 

Anti-tank mines of Italy